Proteocephalidea is an order of tapeworms  which includes the Proteocephalidae family.

References

Cestoda
Platyhelminthes orders